Sapindus oahuensis is a species of tree in the soapberry family, Sapindaceae. It is endemic to Hawaii, where it is limited to Kauai (Waimea Canyon) and Oahu (Waianae and Koolau Ranges). Its common names include Āulu, Oahu soapberry, alulu, kaulu, and lonomea.

It can be found in dry and moist forest habitat at elevations of 200 to 2000 feet.

It has alternately arranged, hairless leaves which have simple blades, unlike its congener, the wingless soapberry (S. saponaria), which has compound leaves. The leaves are somewhat thick and green with a yellow midvein. They are up to 15 centimeters long. The inflorescence is a panicle of many greenish yellow, bell-shaped male and female flowers. The fruit is a shiny, leathery berry roughly 2 centimeters long, containing one large black seed.

The seeds were strung and used in leis.

References

External links

 

oahuensis
Endemic flora of Hawaii
Biota of Kauai
Biota of Oahu
Trees of Hawaii
Plants described in 1878
Taxonomy articles created by Polbot